This is a list of protected natural areas of New Brunswick. For other areas see List of historic places in New Brunswick.

Provincial statute
Provincial parks are managed provincially by Department of Tourism, Heritage and Culture or the Department of Natural Resources. Under the New Brunswick Parks Act, provincial parks are protected from environmental encroachment, and mining, quarries and logging activities are prohibited, per amendments to the Act approved in June, 2014. The wording of the Act, at the time it was enacted, included the following:

Protected areas

National parks 
The following are National Parks of Canada in New Brunswick.

Provincial parks 
This is a list of current provincial parks in the Canadian province of New Brunswick. These provincial parks are maintained by the Department of Tourism, Heritage and Culture. There have been many other provincial parks.

Protected natural areas 
A Protected Natural Area (PNA) is a sanctuary set aside for its unusual or significant local characteristics. Logging is prohibited in all PNAs. Six of the more than 200 PNAs are Class I, allowing access only for scientific research and education and requiring a permit to visit; the remainder are Class II, allowing hunting, fishing, snaring, and light recreational activities like hiking and camping. PNAs sometimes overlap provincial game refuges and wildlife management areas.

With the proclamation of the Protected Natural Areas Act in 2003, 30 existing conservation and ecological areas were converted to PNAs, 20 Class I and 10 Class II. In 2008 most Class I PNAs were downgraded and more than thirty new reserves were added, with two existing PNAs merged and another one split. More than 140 new PNAs were set aside in 2014 by the outgoing Alward government.

Provincial wildlife areas 
The Wildlife Refuges and Wildlife Management Areas Regulation - Fish and Wildlife Act governs the province's game refuges and wildlife management areas. Hunting and trapping are prohibited in these areas.

Other

See also
List of provincial parks in New Brunswick
List of Canadian provincial parks
List of National Parks of Canada
List of National Historic Sites of Canada in New Brunswick

References

External links
Government of New Brunswick - Tourism and Parks

New Brunswick
Protected areas